Abū'l-Ḥasan Mu'nis al-Qushuri (845/6–933), also commonly known by the surnames al-Muẓaffar and al-Khadim ('the Eunuch'), was the commander-in-chief of the Abbasid army from 908 to his death in 933 CE, and virtual dictator and king-maker of the Caliphate from 928 on.

A Byzantine Greek eunuch slave, he entered military service under the future caliph al-Mu'tadid in the 880s. He rose to high rank before his abrupt disgrace, likely the result of his participation court intrigues, in 901. He spent the next seven years in virtual exile as governor of Mecca, before being recalled by Caliph al-Muqtadir in 908. He quickly distinguished himself by saving al-Muqtadir from a palace coup in December 908. With the support of the caliph and the powerful queen-mother, Shaghab, he became commander-in-chief of the caliphal army, in which role he served in several expeditions against the Byzantine Empire, saved Baghdad from the Qarmatians in 927 and defeated two Fatimid invasions of Egypt, in 915 and 920. 

In 924 he helped secure the dismissal and execution of his long-time rival, the vizier Ibn al-Furat, after which his political influence grew enormously, to the point that he briefly deposed al-Muqtadir in 928. His rivalry with the caliph and with the civilian bureaucracy of the court finally resulted in an open confrontation in 931–932, that ended with Mu'nis's victory and al-Muqtadir's death in battle. Mu'nis installed a new caliph, al-Qahir, but in August 933 the latter had Mu'nis and his senior officers executed. Mu'nis's usurpation of power, just as his violent end, marked the beginning of a new period of turmoil for the declining Abbasid Caliphate, culminating in its takeover by the Buyids in 946.

Life

Career under al-Mu'tadid and exile 

According to the 14th-century account of al-Dhahabi, Mu'nis was 90 years old at his death, indicating a birth . Of Byzantine Greek origin, he was a eunuch slave, and is hence called  ('the Eunuch') in the sources to distinguish him from  his contemporary colleague, the treasurer Mu'nis al-Fahl ('the Stallion').

Al-Dhahabi, however, records that in 901 the caliph banished him to Mecca, possibly as its governor, whence he was recalled only after the accession of al-Muqtadir in 908. This is apparently corroborated by his complete absence from the sources during the intervening reign of al-Muktafi. The reason for the banishment is unclear, but was likely related to the power struggles between Badr and al-Mu'tadid's last vizier, al-Qasim ibn Ubayd Allah. Al-Muktafi was apparently also hostile to him, possibly because Mu'nis had been involved in harem intrigues in favour of al-Muqtadir. While at Mecca, he took into his entourage the son of the executed Badr, Hilal.

Campaigns under al-Muqtadir 
Mu'nis rose to prominence early during the reign of al-Muqtadir: in December 908, shortly after the caliph's accession, a faction of the bureaucracy and the army launched a coup to depose him and replace him with his brother Abdallah ibn al-Mu'tazz. Mu'nis led the defence of the Hasani Palace and the coup collapsed. This earned him the gratitude and support of the young caliph and his influential and powerful mother, Shaghab, and solidified his position among the grandees of the Abbasid court. Mu'nis' rise provoked the hostility of the vizier, Ibn al-Furat, who sought to remove him from Baghdad and sent him on campaigns in the frontiers. 
 
In 909 Mu'nis led the customary summer raid against the Byzantine Empire, launching an invasion of Byzantine Asia Minor from Malatya and returning with many prisoners. In the next year, he succeeded in recovering the province of Fars from the declining Saffarids, taking advantage of the strife between the Saffarid emir al-Layth and the former Saffarid general Sebük-eri, who had seized control of the province. When al-Layth's brother al-Mu'addal invaded Fars, Sebük-eri called on the caliph for aid, and an army under Mu'nis was sent. Al-Layth was defeated and captured, while Sebük-eri was soon deposed as governor when he failed to gather the promised tribute. In the same year, 909/10, Mu'nis supervised a prisoner exchange with the Byzantines. In December 912/January 913, he was named governor of the Byzantine frontier zone and of the Hejaz. 

In 914, the Fatimids, who had only a few years before taken over Ifriqiya by ousting the reigning Aghlabids, launched an invasion of Egypt under Abu'l-Qasim, the future caliph al-Qa'im bi-Amr Allah. The Fatimids succeeded in capturing Alexandria, but failed to capture the province's capital at Fustat. In July 914, as deputy of the prince al-Radi (who was the nominal governor), Mu'nis assumed the governorship over Egypt and Syria. On his return from Egypt, he was ordered to suppress the revolt of his old protégé, the Hamdanid Husayn ibn Hamdan in the Jazira. In retaliation, he led a major raid in late summer 916, capturing several fortresses in the vicinity of Malatya, while ordering Abu'l-Qasim Ali to lead another raid from Tarsus. In September/October 917, in response to a Byzantine embassy led by John Rhadenos, he supervised, along with Bishr al-Afshini, the governor of Tarsus and the Cilician , another prisoner exchange on the Lamos River.

In 918–919, Mu'nis campaigned against the rebellious ruler of Adharbayjan, the Sajid Yusuf ibn Abi'l-Saj, who withheld part of the taxes owed to Baghdad and had even seized provinces in northern Iran from the Samanids without the Caliph's approval. In his first campaign in 918, Yusuf initially withdrew before Mu'nis to his capital, Ardabil. After attempts at mediation with the Caliph by the vizier Ibn al-Furat failed, Yusuf confronted Mu'nis in a pitched battle before Ardabil, where Mu'nis was defeated. In the next year, however, Mu'nis defeated Yusuf in a second battle before Ardabil and took him as a prisoner to Baghdad. Yusuf remained captive in Baghdad for three years, while in the meantime, Yusuf's  Subuk held power in Adharbayjan, having secured the Caliph's recognition. It was Mu'nis who was responsible for persuading al-Muqtadir to release Yusuf in 922 and restore him to his old position, this time as a servant of the Abbasid government. In 920–922, Mu'nis was instrumental in defeating a second Fatimid army sent to take Egypt. The Fatimids once again took Alexandria and occupied the Fayyum Oasis, but their fleet was sunk and Alexandria retaken, trapping Abu'l-Qasim in the Fayyum, from which he was able to escape only with heavy losses. In 923, he launched another raid into Byzantine territory, capturing a few forts and returning with much booty.

Court rivalries and coups  

At court, Mu'nis was an early and staunch opponent of Ibn al-Furat, and an ally of the latter's main rival, Ali ibn Isa al-Jarrah and his faction. The conflict between the two came to a head during Ibn al-Furat's third vizierate, in 923–924. This was a troubled period, which saw Mu'nis sent to quasi-exile in Raqqa, the widespread torture of the Banu'l-Furat's political opponents, as well as the resurgence of the Qarmatian threat with the sack of Basra and the destruction of the Hajj caravan returning from Mecca. All this culminated in a military coup, the deposition of Ibn al-Furat, the recall of Mu'nis, and the subsequent execution of the aged vizier and his son.

This marked the apogee of Mu'nis's career: he was now in virtual control of the government and a decisive voice in the appointment of Ibn al-Furat's successors as viziers. At the same time, however, his power created a widening rift between him and the Caliph, with al-Muqtadir even plotting to assassinate his leading general in 927. In the summer of the same year, Mu'nis led an army to the border around Samosata, which the Byzantines had sacked. The Byzantines managed to catch the Abbasid army by surprise and inflicted a defeat upon them, killing 400 men. In the same year Mu'nis, with Hamdanid help, successfully defended Baghdad itself against a determined Qarmatian invasion. The Qarmatian raids were particularly troublesome: not only did they devastate the fertile districts of the Sawad—the government's chief source of revenue—but also diminished the prestige of the Caliph and the dynasty, especially after the Qarmatians sacked Mecca in 930 and carried off the Black Stone, precipitating the power struggle in Baghdad between Mu'nis and the court faction. 

In 928, following the dismissal of his favourite, Ali ibn Isa, from the vizierate, Mu'nis launched a coup and deposed al-Muqtadir and installed his half-brother al-Qahir in his place, but reneged after a few days. Mu'nis now possessed virtually dictatorial authority over the Abbasid government. In 931, al-Muqtadir rallied enough support to force him to leave Baghdad, but in 932, after gathering troops, Mu'nis marched onto Baghdad and defeated the caliphal army before the city walls, with al-Muqtadir falling in the field. Triumphant, Mu'nis now installed al-Qahir as caliph, but the two quickly became estranged. The new caliph resumed contacts with the defeated court faction, and found himself soon under confinement in his palace. Nevertheless, in August 933 al-Qahir managed to lure Mu'nis and his main lieutenants to the palace, where they were executed.

Assessment
The role of Mu'nis in the history of the Abbasid Caliphate is ambiguous. Historian Michael Bonner writes of him that he "kept the remnants of the army together and saved the caliphate on several occasions", while according to the Orientalist Harold Bowen, "Mu'nis's influence was on the whole exerted for good", but he was "neither strong nor intelligent enough" to prevent the renewed decline of the Abbasid state.

References

Sources
 
 
 
 
 
 
 
 
 
 
 

840s births
933 deaths
10th-century executions
Year of birth uncertain
Generals of the Abbasid Caliphate
Abbasid people of the Arab–Byzantine wars
Eunuchs of the Abbasid Caliphate
Commanders in chief
Abbasid ghilman
9th-century people from the Abbasid Caliphate
10th-century people from the Abbasid Caliphate
Greek slaves
Abbasid governors of Mecca